‘Abd Allāh ibn Ḥasan ibn Abī Numayy (died 1 January 1632) was Emir of Mecca and ruler of the Hejaz from 1630 to 1631.

He was elected Emir by agreement of the ashraf on Tuesday, 28 Rabi II 1040 AH (3 December 1630), after the death of Mas'ud ibn Idris. At the time he was the eldest of the House of Abu Numayy. Word was sent to Istanbul, and he received a decree from Sultan Murad IV confirming his election as Emir.

On Friday, 1 Safar 1041 AH (29 August 1631), Abd Allah abdicated in favour of his son Muhammad ibn Abd Allah and his great-nephew Zayd ibn Muhsin, on the proviso that his name continued to be mentioned in the du'a from the minbar.

He died on Friday night, 10 Jumada II 1041 AH (the night of 1–2 January 1632). He was buried in the qubba of his father, Sharif Hasan ibn Abi Numayy.

Issue
He had nine sons:
 Muhammad
 Ahmad
 Hamud
 Husayn
 Hashim
 Thaqabah
 Zamil
 Mubarak
 Zayn al-Abidin

He is the ancestor of the Abadilah clan.

Notes

References
 
 

 
 

Sharifs of Mecca
Banu Qatadah
1632 deaths
17th-century Arabs